Agnete Kirk Thinggaard (born 18 May 1983) is a Danish Olympic dressage rider. Representing Denmark, she competed at the 2016 Summer Olympics in Rio de Janeiro where she finished 26th in the individual and 6th in the team competition.

Kirk Thinggaard also competed at two editions of Dressage World Cup finals (in 2015 and 2016), achieving 11th and 9th place, respectively.

She is the youngest daughter of former Lego CEOs Kjeld Kirk Kristiansen, granddaughter of Godtfred Kirk Christiansen and great-granddaughter of the company founder Ole Kirk Christiansen.

References

External links
 

Living people
1983 births
Danish female equestrians
Danish dressage riders
Place of birth missing (living people)
Equestrians at the 2016 Summer Olympics
Olympic equestrians of Denmark